Atta mexicana is a species of leaf-cutter ant, a New World ant of the subfamily Myrmicinae of the genus Atta. This species is from one of the two genera of advanced attines (fungus-growing ants) within the tribe Attini.

Description
The queen is approximately 30 mm long, and dark brown. Workers are dark brown, with thorns. Soldiers grow up to 18 mm, and are well-fortified.

The ants cut leaves and grow a basidiomycete fungus called Leucoagaricus gongylophorus (Agaricaceae) with them. Oleic acid is one of their undertaking triggers.

Distribution
A. mexicana is found in Mexico (where is commonly called hormiga chicatana, hormiga podadora de hoja/desert ant and mochomo), and crosses into Arizona, United States.

This species is highly adaptive, and thrives in such urban areas as Puerto Vallarta. Densities of A. mexicana nests are very high in numerous areas, including the resort community of Nuevo Vallarta.

Culinary use

The species is found in various locations of central and southern Mexico during the start of the rainy season, when the soil becomes wet and the ants leave for their nuptial flight. That time of the year is the most active for the chicatanas, during which they clean their anthill and create new colonies, becoming very abundant. In Chiapas, for example, they are harvested from late May to early July. In Tuxtla Gutiérrez, they are known as nucú and are prepared in a stew with the same name; in Chiapa de Corzo and Ocosingo they are respectively called nacasmá and cocosh. They are also widely known in Veracruz, Oaxaca, the mountainous areas of Guerrero, Guanajuato, Puebla, Morelos, and Edomex.

When consumed as snacks (botanas), they are uniquely fried with olive oil or toasted on a comal, usually with salt, lemon, and hot sauce, and traditionally accompany the Pox. They are also fried in tacos. In Maya regions, they are stewed in chilmole.

In Mixtec tradition, they are the main ingredient of a sauce called salsa de chicatanas, which is also prepared with chili pepper, onion and garlic and smeared on cooked meat or cheese tortillas. There are several variations of that sauce, such as the one prepared with chile de árbol by the Zoque people of Jamiltepec, the one made with coastal chili in Pinotepa Nacional, and one prepared with guajillo chili in the Mixteca Poblana. In Veracruz, they are included in a pipián called tlatonile.

Gallery

See also
List of leafcutter ants

References

Further reading
Sunjian A and H Li (2005). Atta mexicana in the resort community of Nuevo Vallarta, Mexico. Notes from Underground 11(1).

External links

Images

Atta (genus)
Insects described in 1858
Hymenoptera of North America
Edible insects